The Secret of Skeleton Island may refer to:

Film 
 The Three Investigators and the Secret of Skeleton Island

Literature 
 The Secret of Skeleton Island (Epstein novel) featuring Ken Holt by Sam and Beryl Epstein
 The Secret of Skeleton Island (Three Investigators), a book in the Three Investigators series, upon which the film is based